The following highways are numbered 208:

Canada
  Nova Scotia Route 208
Prince Edward Island Route 208
  Quebec Route 208

China
 China National Highway 208

Japan
 Japan National Route 208

United States
 Alabama State Route 208
 California State Route 208 (former)
 Florida State Road 208
 Georgia State Route 208
 Kentucky Route 208
 Maine State Route 208
 Maryland Route 208
 M-208 (Michigan highway) (former)
 Montana Secondary Highway 208
 Nevada State Route 208
 New Jersey Route 208
 New Mexico State Road 208
 New York State Route 208
 North Carolina Highway 208
 Ohio State Route 208
 Oregon Route 208 (former)
 Pennsylvania Route 208
 Tennessee State Route 208
 Texas State Highway 208
 Farm to Market Road 208 (former)
 Utah State Route 208
 Virginia State Route 208
Territories
 Puerto Rico Highway 208 (unbuilt)